The Aușel is a left tributary of the river Taia in Romania. It flows into the Taia north of the town Petrila.

References

Rivers of Romania
Rivers of Hunedoara County